Gangari, or Gangadi,, is a dialect of Garhwali spoken primarily in the district of Uttarkashi in the state of Uttarakhand, northern India.

There are three genders (masculine, feminine and neuter) and two numbers (singular and plural). The respective endings for nouns are:
masculine singular: -o
masculine plural: -a
feminine singular: -e
feminine plural: -ae
neuter singular: -a
neuter plural: -a:

References

Languages of Uttarakhand
Northern Indo-Aryan languages